The Combination was a league during the early days of English football. It had two incarnations; the first ran only for the 1888–89 season for teams across the Northern England and the Midlands, and was wound up before completion. The second  was created for the 1890–91 season, but disbanded in 1911. The league comprised teams primarily from North West England and later Wales.

The league should not be confused with the other former Football Combination, a competition for reserve teams from the South of England, or with the Lancashire Combination, another minor league running around the same time.

First incarnation

The first Combination was set up in 1888, the same year the Football League was founded. It was established by clubs who had been excluded from the Football League, initiated by Crewe Alexandra secretary J. G. Hall, and was announced at the Royal Hotel in Crewe.  The clubs in attendance were Small Heath Alliance, Walsall Town Swifts, Derby Midland, Notts Rangers, Burslem Port Vale, Leek, Crewe Alexandra, Newton Heath, Witton, and Blackburn Olympic; three other clubs, Mitchell St George's, Halliwell, and Derby Junction, all wrote to pledge acceptance of all decisions, and Northwich Victoria also wrote requesting membership.  The meeting was chaired by A. M. Sloane, the chairman of Bootle.  The clubs agreed that there would be no more than 20 members and each would play at least 8 matches home and away.  Harry Mitchell of St George's was elected President.

However, while the Football League quickly proved a success, the Combination lacked central organisation, with poor planning and unfulfilled fixtures; as early as October the media were complaining about the difficulties in following the competition and by January 1889 the media were commenting that "it is becoming the exception rather than the rule to keep a Combination fixture".  The Combination therefore failed to complete its first season, finishing in April 1889 without a winner.

Fixtures were left to individual clubs, which resulted in confusion, as it was unclear whether many matches between clubs were friendlies or Combination matches.  The Combination was finally wound up at a board meeting on 5 April 1889.  The meeting was over in 25 minutes, the motion to dissolve the Combination being passed unanimously, after which those present enjoyed cold beef and pickles; the meeting was so quick that the Darwen representative, who had missed his train, arrived too late.  However, a dozen of the representatives had another meeting afterwards, which formed the basis of the Football Alliance. 

Participating teams included Bootle, Blackburn Olympic, Burslem Port Vale, Crewe Alexandra, Grimsby Town, Lincoln City, Newton Heath, Small Heath and South Shore. Bootle, Crewe, Grimsby, Newton Heath and Small Heath went on to co-found the Football Alliance the following year.

Second incarnation

The second incarnation was founded in 1890. The twelve founder members were:

Burton Swifts
Chester
Denton
Derby St Luke's
Gorton Villa
Hyde
Leek (not related to the current Leek Town)
Macclesfield
Northwich Victoria
Stafford County (not related to the current Stafford Rangers)
Witton (not related to the current Witton Albion)
Wrexham

Five of the founding teams would eventually go on to play in the Football League, although in the case of Macclesfield, this would not happen until 1997–98. Glossop North End, who joined in 1894, were also elected to the League (in 1898), as were another later member team, Tranmere Rovers.

As the competition evolved, the nature of the teams changed, with many more Welsh teams being involved, as well as the reserve teams of the Football League clubs such as Everton and Crewe Alexandra. By the time the competition folded in 1911 none of the original members still participated, with the exception of Wrexham, who fielded their reserve team. It was succeeded by the Cheshire County League and later by the North West Counties Football League.

Champions
The champions of the league were as follows:

References

 
Combination, The
Sports leagues established in 1888
Football leagues in Wales